The 1910–11 season was the eighteenth season in which Dundee competed at a Scottish national level, playing in Division One, where they would finish in 6th place for the 2nd straight season. Dundee would also compete in the Scottish Cup, where they would mount a serious attempt to repeat their triumph the previous season, making it to the Semi-finals before losing to Hamilton Academical.

Scottish Division One 

Statistics provided by Dee Archive.

League table

Scottish Cup 

Statistics provided by Dee Archive.

Player Statistics 
Statistics provided by Dee Archive

|}

See also 

 List of Dundee F.C. seasons

References 

 

Dundee F.C. seasons
Dundee